opened in Takasaki, Gunma Prefecture, Japan, in 1974. The collection includes works by Monet, Renoir, and Soga Jasoku.

See also
 List of Cultural Properties of Japan - paintings (Gunma)

References

External links
  The Museum of Modern Art, Gunma
  The Museum of Modern Art, Gunma

Museums in Gunma Prefecture
Art museums and galleries in Japan
Museums established in 1974
1974 establishments in Japan
Takasaki, Gunma
Modern art museums in Japan